Roger Wolcott Richardson (30 May 1930 – 15 June 1993) was a mathematician noted for his work in representation theory and geometry. He was born in Baton Rouge, Louisiana, and educated at Louisiana State University, Harvard University and University of Michigan, Ann Arbor where he obtained a Ph.D. in 1958 under the supervision of Hans Samelson. 
After a postdoc appointment at Princeton University, he accepted a faculty position at the University of Washington in Seattle. He emigrated to the United Kingdom in 1970, taking up a chair at Durham University. In 1978 he moved to the Australian National University in Canberra, where he stayed as faculty until his death.

Richardson's best known result states that if P is a parabolic subgroup of a reductive group, then P has a dense orbit on its nilradical, i.e., one whose closure is the whole space. This orbit is now universally known as the Richardson orbit.

Publications

See also

 Prehomogeneous vector space

External links 
 
 Mathematical Reviews analysis

References

1930 births
1993 deaths
20th-century American mathematicians
Algebraists
Louisiana State University alumni
Harvard University alumni
University of Michigan alumni
Australian mathematicians
Fellows of the Australian Academy of Science
People from Baton Rouge, Louisiana
Mathematicians from Louisiana
University of Washington faculty
Princeton University people
Academics of Durham University
Academic staff of the Australian National University